Brusyliv is an urban-type settlement in Zhytomyr Raion, eastern part of Zhytomyr Oblast, northern Ukraine. Brusyliv is the center of the Brusyliv urban hromada, being situated on the river Zdvyzh. It has the status of an urban-type settlement since 1979. Population:

Geography 
Brusyliv is situated 29 km from the railway station Skochyshche, 56 km from Zhytomyr by railway and by 78 km by highway. First historical mention dates to 1543. Postal code for Brusyliv is 12605 and telephone code is +380-4162 (with international prefix +380). Mayor of the town in 2006 was Leonid Rybets.

Famous personalities 
 Ivan Ohienko (1882–1972) – Ukrainian linguist, historian and religious figure.
 David Ignatoff (1885–1954) – Yiddish writer and dramatist active in the USA.
 Stanislav Boklan (1960) – Ukrainian actor.

References

External links
 Find out Brusyliv @ Ukrainian.Travel {Eng}

Urban-type settlements in Zhytomyr Raion
Radomyslsky Uyezd